Mario Agnes (6 December 1931, Serino – 9 May 2018, Vatican City) was an Italian journalist.  In 1984 he was appointed editor-in-chief of L'Osservatore Romano by Pope John Paul II.  He held the position until his retirement in 2007, at which point he was honored by Pope Benedict XVI.

References 

1931 births
2018 deaths
Italian male journalists
20th-century Italian journalists
21st-century Italian journalists
People from the Province of Avellino
L'Osservatore Romano editors
20th-century Italian male writers